Abram Litton (May 20, 1814 – September 22, 1901) was an Irish-American chemist and educator. He was Washington University in St. Louis's first professor of chemistry, who served as the acting chancellor during 1869–1870.

Biography
Abram Litton was born in Dublin on May 20, 1814. His family emigrated from Ireland to Nashville, Tennessee when he was three years old.

He graduated from the University of Nashville at age 17. In 1839, he moved to Europe to study chemistry. Three years later, he returned to the United States to accept the Professorship of Chemistry at Washington University in St. Louis. In 1843, he became Professor of Chemistry in the St. Louis Medical College. He held that position for fifty years, and died in St. Louis on September 22, 1901.

References

External links

Washington University in St. Louis

1814 births
1901 deaths
19th-century American chemists
Burials at Bellefontaine Cemetery
Chancellors of Washington University in St. Louis
Irish emigrants to the United States (before 1923)
University of Nashville alumni
Washington University in St. Louis faculty
Washington University School of Medicine faculty
American people of Irish descent